INS Vagsheer (S43) was a  diesel-electric submarine of the Indian Navy.

References

Foxtrot-class submarines
Ships built in the Soviet Union
1974 ships
Vela-class submarines